Aerolyon is a former French long haul and charter airline which ceased to exist in 2002.

History
Aerolyon was a long haul airline based in Lyon, France. It flew from various airports in France, including Lyon, Paris, Brest, Nantes and Bordeaux to the Caribbean, West Indies and other overseas French territories. It was owned by French travel company Nouvelles Frontieres, who also owned Corsairfly. It also worked as a charter airline, and offered services for other carriers. In 2000, it would theoretically have been taken over by TUI AG when they purchased Nouvelles Frontieres. TUI AG took control of Corsairfly.

In 1996, Aerolyon leased a McDonnell Douglas DC-10-30 from ChallengAir. Following that lease in 1997, another DC-10 joined the fleet in 1999 along with a third aircraft in 2002. The airline would never expand beyond three DC-10s.

Aerolyon went into liquidation in 2002.

Fleet

Aerolyon operated the following aircraft. Two of the original aircraft were scrapped after Aerolyon's demise, and one of the first aircraft delivered to the company in 1997 is currently in storage.

Revival attempt
Aeroplus L'Air, an outfit run by Jean-Marie Gras attempted to create a revival of the airline using a single Airbus A340. However in December 2002, a court in Lyon decided that a rescue plan was too risky, and rejected the proposal.

The ICAO code of Aerolyon, which was passed to Aeroplus L'Air of AEY is now used by Air Italy.

References

External links

Defunct airlines of France
Airlines established in 1996
Airlines disestablished in 2002
1996 establishments in France
2002 disestablishments in France